Coyle Field  is a private-use airport established in 1938 and located five miles southeast of Chatsworth in Burlington County, New Jersey in the United States. It is owned by and operated as an air attack base by the New Jersey Forest Fire Service in its wildfire suppression and aerial firefighting efforts. Coyle Field is named after Leonidas Coyle, who served as state firewarden from 1923–1937 and who developed New Jersey's use of airplanes in wildfire observation and reconnaissance.

See also
 Aeroflex–Andover Airport
 Strawberry Field (airport)

References

External links
 New Jersey Forest Fire Service (official website)

New Jersey Forest Fire Service
Airports in New Jersey
Transportation buildings and structures in Burlington County, New Jersey